Pedrito, meaning "little Pedro" or "little Peter" in many Romance languages, may refer to:

People
 Pedrito (footballer, born 1989), Spanish forward
 Pedrito (footballer, born 1996), Spanish midfielder
 Pedrito Reyes (fl. 1930s), Filipino writer, co-creator of the Kulafu comic strip
 Pedrito Ríos, semi-mythical "drummer boy of Tacuarí"
 Pedrito Sierra (born 1989), Puerto Rican volleyball player
 Don Pedro Jaramillo (died 1907), curandero from the Mexico-Texas border region, known as "Don Pedrito"
 Pedro Calvo, Cuban popular singer known as "Pedrito"
 Pedro Fernández (singer) (born 1969), Mexican recording artist and actor, known as "Pedrito"
 Pedro Ruiz Carrilero, a feridor for Circuit Bancaixa 05/06 a Spanish pilota team
 Margarita Landi (1918–2004), Spanish journalist

Places
 Dom Pedrito, a municipality in Rio Grande do Sul, Brazil
 Nazca (Buenos Aires Metro), a station on the Buenos Aires Metro, known as "San Pedrito"
 San Pedrito Point, a headland at Todos los Santos, Baja California Sur
 San Pedrito, a beach off San Pedrito Point
 San Pedrito, a beach in Manzanillo Municipality, Colima, Mexico
 San Pedrito, a shrine in the Macizo de Anaga mountains of the Canary Islands

Other uses
 "Pedrito Chávez", a song by Dominican folk musician Ñico Lora
 Pedrito el Drito,  an Italian comic series
 Puerto Rican tody, a bird known as "San Pedrito"